The 1962–63 Israel State Cup (Gvia HaMedina) was the 24th season of Israel's nationwide football cup competition and the ninth after the Israeli Declaration of Independence.

The competition began on 24 March 1962, before the completion of the previous competition. However, once again, the competition took more than a year to complete, with the final being played on 27 May 1963. Hapoel Haifa and Maccabi Haifa met in the final, at Kiryat Eliezer Stadium, Hapoel winning by a single goal to claim their first cup.

Results

Fourth Round
Matches were held on 19 May 1962. The match between Maccabi Netanya and Hapoel Petah Tikva, the match between Shimshon Tel Aviv and Hapoel Tel Aviv, and the matches which had to be replayed, were postponed for 6 October 1962, in parallel with the fifth round matches.

Byes: Hapoel Kfar Ata, Hapoel Ramla, Maccabi Ramat Gan, Maccabi Sha'arayim, Shefa-'Amr Club.

Fifth Round
Matches were held on 6 October 1962. The match between Beitar Tel Aviv and Maccabi Rehovot was held on 2 February 1963. The match between Hapoel Tel Aviv and Maccabi Jaffa was held on 9 February 1963. The match between Hapoel Petah Tikva and Hapoel Ramla and the match between Hapoel Dimona and Beitar Jerusalem were held on 12 February 1963. The replayed match between Beitar Jerusalem and Hapoel Dimona was held on 19 February 1963.

Sixth Round
Matches were held on 2 March 1963. Hapoel Nahariya surprised by defeating Maccabi Tel Aviv 1–0 through a late goal. Maccabi Tel Aviv appealed the result, claiming Hapoel Nahariya fielded an ineligible player. Initially the match was given to Maccabi Tel Aviv, however, after further appeal, and based on the precedent set by Maccabi Haifa in the previous competition, the result was reinstated. Maccabi Tel Aviv appealed once more, but the appeal wasn't heard until September 1963, by which time the competition was over and the appeal was denied.

Quarter-finals

Semi-finals
The matches were supposed to be held on 23 April 1963. However, they were postponed because of the death of President Itzhak Ben-Zvi. The matches were set to 7 May 1963 and 11 May 1963, however, the first match, between Hapoel Haifa and Maccabi Sha'arayim was cancelled due to the falling out of Hapoel and Maccabi factions at the IFA over bribery suspicions against Maccabi Petah Tikva during the 1962–63 Liga Leumit season. The two factions reconciled in time for the second match to be played.

Replay

Final

References
100 Years of Football 1906-2006, Elisha Shohat (Israel), 2006
(Page 4) Hadshot HaSport, 20.5.1962, archive.football.co.il 
24 Matches were held yesterday in the fourth round of Football State Cup Davar, 20.5.1962, Historical Jewish Press 
(Page 4) Hadshot HaSport, 7.10.1962, archive.football.co.il

External links
 Israel Football Association website

Israel State Cup
State Cup
State Cup
Israel State Cup seasons